Oreshak may refer to:

Oreshak, Lovech Province, Bulgaria
Oreshak, Varna Province, Bulgaria
Oreshak Peak, Antarctica